Socks Clinton ( – February 20, 2009) was the pet cat of the Clinton family, the first family of the United States from 1993 to 2001. As an adopted stray cat, he was the only pet of the Clintons during the early years of the administration, and his likeness hosted the children's version of the White House website. After Clinton left office, Socks resided with former Clinton secretary Betty Currie and her husband, owing to continuing conflicts with the Clintons' dog Buddy.

Biography 

Socks was likely born in early 1989, based on a veterinarian's estimate that he would have turned 20 in early 2009. He was adopted by the Clintons in 1991 after he jumped into the arms of Chelsea Clinton as she was leaving the house of her piano teacher in Little Rock, Arkansas, where he was playing with his sibling, Midnight, who was later adopted by another family. His name was inspired by his white paws, which resembled those of the title character of the Beverly Cleary novel Socks.

When Bill Clinton became president, Socks moved with the family from the governor's mansion to the White House and became the principal pet of the First Family in Clinton's first term. He was often taken to schools and hospitals. During the Clinton administration, children visiting the White House website would be guided by a cartoon version of Socks.

Bill Clinton said, "I did better with the Palestinians and the Israelis than I've done with Socks and Buddy." When the Clintons left the White House in 2001, they took Buddy to their new home, but left Socks under the care of Bill Clinton's secretary, Betty Currie. Buddy would die within a year, being hit by a car in 2002.

By June 2008, Socks was still living with Currie and her husband in Hollywood, Maryland, about 60 miles from Washington, but had a thyroid condition, hair loss, weight loss, and kidney problems.

In December 2008, Socks was reported to be in failing health, apparently suffering from cancer. Socks was euthanized on February 20, 2009, in Hollywood, Maryland, after suffering cancer of the jaw. Time had an obituary of Socks in its milestones section.

Investigation
Representative Dan Burton, then the chairman of the House Oversight Committee, once publicly questioned the use of White House staff, postage, and stationery to answer mail addressed to the cat.

Cultural references
First Lady Hillary Clinton carried a Socks-shaped minaudière to the 1997 Inaugural Ball. It was designed by Judith Leiber, a designer famous for her whimsically shaped, rhinestone-encrusted evening bags. The bag is currently on display at the Amsterdam Museum of Bags and Purses.

Hillary Clinton wrote a children's book called Dear Socks, Dear Buddy: Kids' Letters to the First Pets in 1998. 

A cartoon book called Socks Goes to Washington: The Diary of America's First Cat, written by Michael O'Donoghue and Jean-Claude Suares, was published in 1993.

Socks was featured prominently in an episode of the sitcom Murphy Brown in December 1993 entitled "Sox and the Single Girl," in which Socks is inadvertently removed from the White House during a press dinner. On the April 1, 1994, edition of Larry King Live, a Muppet version of Socks was a special guest interviewed by Kermit the Frog, who was guest hosting for Larry King at the time.

Socks was to be the subject of a canceled 1993 video game entitled Socks the Cat Rocks the Hill for the Super NES and Sega Genesis platforms. The game was released by popular demand in 2018.

In his announcement of the Next Generation Internet Initiative in 1996, Bill Clinton said, "When I took office, only high energy physicists had ever heard of what is called the World Wide Web. Now even my cat has its own page."

The women's clothing brand Soccx, produced by the German company Clinton Großhandels-GmbH, was named after Socks. The company's other brands, Camp David and Chelsea, are also references to the Clintons.

Gallery

See also
 United States presidential pets
 Socks, 1973 novel
 List of individual cats

References

External links

 Picture with photographers
 Socks meets Buddy (January 6, 1998)
 Purr 'n' Fur Famous Felines: Socks Clinton, and other Presidential Felines
 A web-based version of the children's book, Socks Goes to the White House – A Cats-eye view of the President's house

1989 animal births
2009 animal deaths
Animal deaths by euthanasia
Bill Clinton
Hillary Clinton
United States presidential cats